Maria Carta (24 June 1934 – 22 September 1994) was a Sardinian folk music singer-songwriter. She also performed in film and theatre. In 1975 she wrote a book of poetry, Canto rituale (Ritual Song).

Throughout her 25-year career she covered the richly diverse genres of traditional music of her native Sardinia (Cantu a chiterra, ninne nanne—children's lullabies, gosos, Gregorian chants, and more), often updating them with a modern and personal touch. She succeeded in bringing Sardinian folk music into wider popular awareness in demonstrations at a national level in Italy (like the Canzonissima in 1974) as well as internationally (especially in France and the United States).

Career 
Maria Carta won the Miss Sardinia beauty contest in 1957 and later participated in the national Miss Italy competition.

Around 1960, she moved to Rome where she met the screenwriter Salvatore Laurani whom she later married. She attended the Centro Nazionale di Studi di Musica Popolare, directed by Diego Carpitella, at the National Academy of Santa Cecilia and at the same time she pursued a musical and ethnographic research path with important productions and collaborations.

In 1971, she made two albums: Sardegna canta and Paradiso in re, and in the meantime she attended the ethnomusicologist Gavino Gabriel. The same year RAI broadcast the television documentary Incontro con Maria Carta (photography by Franco Pinna and texts by Velia Magno), in which she sang and recited with Riccardo Cucciolla.

In 1972, she played at the Teatro Argentina in Rome in the Medea by Franco Enriquez. The same year she met Amália Rodrigues, with whom she held a concert at the Teatro Sistina. In 1973, the two artists made a tour in Sardinia.

In 1974, she participated in Canzonissima, interpreting the traditional Sardinian Ave Maria Deus ti salvet Maria. She reached the final and was ranked second in the group of folk music with the song Amore disisperadu. In 1975, she held an important concert at the Bolshoi Theatre in Moscow. In 1976, she served as Communal Councilwoman for the Italian Communist Party, in the city council of Rome and remained in office until 1981.

In 1980, she participated in the Festival d'Avignon; in 1987 she performed in St. Patrick's Cathedral in New York City; and in 1988 in St. Mary's Cathedral in San Francisco.

She caught the attention of such directors as Francis Ford Coppola – who gave her the first of two of her widely-seen film roles as the mother of Vito Corleone in The Godfather Part II (1974) – and Franco Zeffirelli, who cast her as Martha, the sister of Lazarus, in Jesus of Nazareth (1977).
 
In 1985, she was awarded, as songwriter, the Targo Tenco for dialectal/regional music.

In the last years of her life, Carta gave her time to the University of Bologna where she conducted a series of classes and advised student theses on which she had relevant personal, human experience and scholarly background.

In 1991, the President of Italy, Francesco Cossiga, named her a "Commendatore della Repubblica" ("Knight of the Republic"), similar to the British CBE.

Death
Maria Carta gave her last concert in Toulouse, France, on 30 June 1994. Ill with cancer, she died at her home in Rome on 22 September 1994, aged 60.

Discography

1971: Sardegna canta
1971: Ninna nanna / Muttos de amore
1971: Adiu a mama / Antoneddu Antoneddu
1971: Trallallera corsicana / La ragazza moderna
1971: Paradiso in Re
1973: Nuovo maggio / Funerale di un lavoratore
1974: Dilliriende
1974: Amore disisperadu / Ave Maria
1974: Dies Irae
1975: Diglielo al tuo Dio  / Nuovo maggio
1975: Maria Carta
1976: Vi canto una storia assai vera
1976: La voce e i canti di Maria Carta vol.1
1976: La voce e i canti di Maria Carta vol. 2
1978: No potho reposare / Ballada ogliastrina / Muttettu
1978: Umbras
1980: Haidiridiridiridiridinni
1984: Maria Carta concerto dal vivo 
1981: Sonos ‘e memoria
1984: Sonos’ e memoria
1992: Chelu e mare
1993: Le memorie della musica
1993: Muttos ‘e amore
1993: Trallallera
2002: Sardegna canta
2012: Il Recital di Maria Carta e Amalia Rodriguez with Amália Rodrigues (live album) Recorded in Rome in 1972.

Filmography

References

External links 
 
 Sardegna Digital Library – Video with Maria

1934 births
1994 deaths
Deaths from cancer in Lazio
Sardinian women
Italian folk singers
Music in Sardinia
Sardinian literature
People from Siligo
20th-century Italian actresses
20th-century Italian women writers
20th-century Italian women singers